Lyudmyla Kichenok and Jeļena Ostapenko won the women's doubles title at the 2022 Birmingham Classic, after Elise Mertens and Zhang Shuai withdrew from the final due to an injury sustained by Zhang during the singles final.

Marie Bouzková and Lucie Hradecká were the defending champions; since Bouzková did not return to compete, Hradecká partnered alongside Sania Mirza – they lost in the semifinals to Kichenok and Ostapenko.

Seeds

Draw

Draw

References

External links 
 Main draw
 
 WTA website

Birmingham Classicandnbsp;- Doubles
Doubles
2022 in English tennis